Tyrannens fald is a 1942 Danish family film directed by Jon Iversen and Alice O'Fredericks. It is a remake of Master of the House (1925).

Cast
 Eyvind Johan-Svendsen - Viktor Frandsen
 Karin Nellemose - Ida Frandsen
 Birthe Scherf - Karen Frandsen
 Anker Ørskov - Frederik Frandsen
 Ib Schønberg - Ove Frandsen
 Lily Weiding - Ulla Kryer
 Mathilde Nielsen - Hushjælpen Mads
 Carlo Wieth - Skovrider Axel Høegh
 Poul Reichhardt - Mogens Høegh
 Astrid Villaume - Frk. Anne Høegh / 'Søster'
 Nicolai Neiiendam - Dr. Ulllerup
 Erik Voigt - Fru Danielsen
 Petrine Sonne - Fru Hansen
 Randi Michelsen - Frk. Beck
 Henry Nielsen - Stationsforstander
 Lis Løwert - Ullas veninde Else

See also
Master of the House (1925)

References

External links

1942 films
1940s Danish-language films
Danish black-and-white films
Films directed by Alice O'Fredericks
Films scored by Sven Gyldmark
Danish films based on plays
Remakes of Danish films